Barbus issenensis is a doubtfully distinct ray-finned fish species in the family Cyprinidae.

It is found only in Morocco. Its natural habitat is freshwater springs. It is threatened by habitat loss.

The taxonomy and systematics of the Maghreb barbs are subject to considerable dispute. Some authors consider B. issensis a distinct species, while others include it in the Algerian barb (Luciobarbus callensis).

References

I
Endemic fauna of Morocco
Fish described in 1922
Taxonomy articles created by Polbot
Taxobox binomials not recognized by IUCN